Cristoforo Munari (July 21, 1667 – June 3, 1720) was an Italian painter in the Baroque period specializing in still life paintings. He was also known as Cristofano Monari.

His initial training was in Reggio Emilia, his birthplace, and he came under the patronage of Rinaldo d'Este, Duke of Modena. In 1703-1706, he lived in Rome, then moved to Florence, where for about a decade he was attached to the court of the Medici. His still life paintings recall those of Evaristo Baschenis; however, the added disarray of porcelain, glass, and foodstuffs, suggest the hangover from the jovial surfeit of the Medici court. He painted also panoplies and war trophies. In 1715 he moved to Pisa, where he worked almost exclusively in art restoration; he died in 1720.

An exhibition of his paintings took place in 1998 in Reggio Emilia, where it attracted wide attention and was a national success.

External links
Grove encyclopedia biography on Artnet
Works

1667 births
1720 deaths
People from Reggio Emilia
17th-century Italian painters
Italian male painters
18th-century Italian painters
Italian Baroque painters
Italian still life painters
18th-century Italian male artists